RN or Rn may refer to:

Places
 Rio Grande do Norte, Brazilian state (ISO 3166-2:BR code RN)
 Province of Rimini, Italy (ISO 3166-2:IT code)
 County Roscommon, Ireland (code)

Politics
 National Rally (France) (Rassemblement national), a far-right French political party
 Resistencia Nacional, a revolutionary socialist party in El Salvador
  or National Renewal (Chile), a liberal conservative party in  Chile
 Ruch Narodowy, a Polish far-right political party
 Fuerzas Armadas de la Resistencia Nacional, was the military arm of the National Resistance, a Salvadoran communist organization

Science and technology
 Radon, symbol Rn, a chemical element
 rn (newsreader), a Usenet news client
 Newline, represented as \r\n in certain operating systems
 Round nose, a type of bullet
 Recurrent nova, a class of repeating cataclysmic variable stars

Other
 Royal Navy, UK
 Radio National, Australia
 Registered nurse, a licensed health care provider
 RN: the Memoirs of Richard Nixon, an autobiography
 Registered Identification Number, a US FTC code used on clothing labels
 Air Horizons, a former airline (IATA: RN)
 Kirundi language (ISO 639-1: RN)